Prithvipur Assembly constituency is one of the 230 Vidhan Sabha (Legislative Assembly) constituencies of Madhya Pradesh state in central India. Initially, it came into existence in 1951 as one of the 48 Vidhan Sabha constituencies of the erstwhile Vindhya Pradesh state, but it was abolished in 1956. This constituency again came into existence in 2008, following the delimitation of the legislative assembly constituencies. 
Prithvipur is small town of Bundelkhand.
It's a city of politics.

Overview
Prithvipur (constituency number 45) is one of the 5 Vidhan Sabha constituencies located in Niwari District. This constituency covers the Prithvipur and Jeron Khalsa nagar panchayats and parts of Jatara and Prithvipur tehsils of the district.

Prithivpur is part of Tikamgarh Lok Sabha constituency along with seven other Vidhan Sabha segments, namely, Tikamgarh, Jatara, Niwari and Khargapur in this district and Maharajpur, Chhatarpur and Bijawar in Chhatarpur district.

Members of Legislative Assembly
As from a constituency of Vindhya Pradesh:
 1951: Shyam Lal, Indian National Congress 
As from a constituency of Madhya Pradesh:
 2008: Brajendra Singh Rathore, Indian National Congress
 2013: Aneeta-Suneel Nayak, Bhartiya Janata party
 2018: Brijendra Singh Rathore, Indian National Congress
 2021 by-poll: Shishupal Yadav, Bharatiya Janata Party

Election results

2021 Bypoll

References

Tikamgarh district
Assembly constituencies of Madhya Pradesh